At My Worst may refer to:

 At My Worst (EP), a 2010 EP by Caroline Ailin
 "At My Worst", a 2020 single by Pink Sweats